Keith Davis may refer to:
 Keith Davis (safety) (born 1978), former American football safety
 Keith Davis (linebacker), former American football linebacker and current motivational speaker
 Keith Davis (cricketer) (born 1935), English cricketer
 Keith Davis (rugby union) (born 1930), former international New Zealand rugby union player
 Keith F. Davis (born 1952), American photography curator

See also
Shooting of Keith Davis, Jr.
 Keith Davies, Welsh Labour politician
 Keith Davies (footballer), footballer for Tranmere Rovers